Bayerxenia is a genus of soft corals in the family Xeniidae. It is monotypic with a single species, Bayerxenia janesi

References

Xeniidae
Octocorallia genera